Cameron Michael "Cam" Gibson (born 14 August 1982 in Auckland) is a New Zealand swimming competitor. He won a bronze medal in the 200m backstroke at the 2006 Commonwealth Games in a time of 2:00.72 minutes.

He competed at the 2004 Summer Olympics and the 2008 Summer Olympics.  In the latter he swam the final, freestyle, leg for the New Zealand team which finish fifth in the final of Men's 4 × 100 metre medley relay.

References

External links
 
 
 
 
 

1982 births
Living people
New Zealand male backstroke swimmers
Swimmers from Auckland
Olympic swimmers of New Zealand
Swimmers at the 2004 Summer Olympics
Swimmers at the 2008 Summer Olympics
Swimmers at the 2006 Commonwealth Games
Swimmers at the 2002 Commonwealth Games
Commonwealth Games bronze medallists for New Zealand
Medalists at the FINA World Swimming Championships (25 m)
Commonwealth Games medallists in swimming
21st-century New Zealand people
Medallists at the 2006 Commonwealth Games